Polyneikis Kalamaras is a Greek boxer. In 2018, he won a bronze medal at the 2018 Mediterranean Games.

References

Mediterranean Games bronze medalists for Greece
Competitors at the 2018 Mediterranean Games
Greek male boxers
Mediterranean Games medalists in boxing
Living people
1995 births
Boxers at the 2015 European Games
European Games competitors for Greece
Light-heavyweight boxers
21st-century Greek people